Holy Cross High School is a Catholic High School in Hamilton, South Lanarkshire, in Scotland.

History
The original site on Muir Street started out as St Mary's Primary in the 1930s and became Holy Cross High School in the 1950s using the original St Mary's building and some prefabricated wooden buildings. External buildings were used for Art teaching. The main stone built building housed the Rector's office and the main staff rooms along with Classics, English, Maths and Physical Education departments.

The wooden buildings were demolished in the early 1970s to make way for the concrete and steel prefabricated buildings that formed the rest of the site and were built between 1970 and 1971. The original 1930s building remained until 2010 when the Muir Street site was completely demolished after Trinity High, normally based in Rutherglen, had finished their temporary occupation while their new school was being built.

In 2007 Holy Cross High School relocated to a new building in New Park Street as part of South Lanarkshire Council's ongoing school modernisation programme.  As of 2020, it has a roll of almost 1200 pupils.

Feeder Primary Schools
Our Lady and St. Anne's Primary (Hamilton), St. Bride's Primary (Bothwell), St. Elizabeth's Primary (Hamilton), St. John's Primary (Blackwood), St. John the Baptist Primary (Uddingston), St. Mary's Primary (Hamilton), St. Mary's Primary (Larkhall), St. Patrick's Primary (Strathaven) and St. Paul's Primary (Hamilton).

Motto and badge
The school's motto is "Spes Unica" ("Our only hope") referring to the depiction of the cross on the school badge.

Notable former pupils

Martin Boyce - Turner Prize winning artist
Donnie Burns  - Dancer 14-time World Professional Latin champion
Gregory Clark (economist) - Professor of Economics University of California Davis
Matthew Clarke, Lord Clarke, Judge
Michael Hart - Preston North End player
Paul Hartley - football manager and former player
John McCusker - Musician, producer
Alan McManus - Snooker player
Stephen McManus - Motherwell F.C. player
Paul McStay - Celtic F.C. player
Willie McStay - Celtic F.C. player
Phil O'Donnell - Motherwell F.C. player and Celtic F.C Player
Geraldine O'Neill - author of several novels, particularly about women.

References

External links
Holy Cross High School
South Lanarkshire Council
Holy Cross High's page on Scottish Schools Online

Catholic secondary schools in South Lanarkshire
Buildings and structures in Hamilton, South Lanarkshire
Secondary schools in South Lanarkshire
School buildings completed in 2007
Bothwell and Uddingston